Benito Sarti (23 July 1936 – 4 February 2020) was an Italian professional footballer who played as a defender or midfielder.

Club career
Sarti made his Serie A debut with Padova (1954–1957) at the age of 19, in a 4–1 away loss to Milan on 26 February 1956, during the 1955–56 Serie A season; he subsequently played for Sampdoria (1957–1959), making 63 appearances for the club. He played for Juventus between 1959 and 1968, obtaining 252 appearances, 206 of which came in Serie A, scoring one goal, which came from long-range in a 6–3 away victory over Atalanta during the 1962–63 Serie A season. During his time with club, he won three Serie A titles, as well as three Coppa Italia titles, and a Coppa delle Alpi. He ended his career after a season with Varese (1968–69).

International career
At international level, Sarti made his senior debut for Italy on 9 November 1958, in a 2–2 friendly draw against France, in Paris. In total, he made six appearances for Italy between 1958 and 1961.

Style of play
Primarily a defender, Sarti usually played as a full-back, although he was also capable of playing as a central or defensive midfielder on occasion.

Death
Sarti died on 4 February 2020, at the age of 83.

Honours
Juventus
 Serie A champion: 1959–60, 1960–61, 1966–67.
 Coppa Italia winner: 1958–59, 1959–60, 1964–65.
 Coppa delle Alpi winner: 1963.

References

External links
 
 Profile at Enciclopedia del Calcio 
 Profile at FIGC 

1936 births
2020 deaths
Italian footballers
Italy international footballers
Serie A players
Calcio Padova players
U.C. Sampdoria players
Juventus F.C. players
S.S.D. Varese Calcio players
Association football defenders